ESPN College Extra is an American multinational out-of-market sports package owned by ESPN Inc. It was launched on September 5, 2015, as a merger of the existing ESPN Full Court and ESPN GamePlan, each of which offered college basketball and college football broadcasts respectively.

ESPN College Extra broadcasts are drawn from the available live games from ESPN3. ESPN College Extra broadcasts college sports from NCAA FBS and FCS conferences, including football, basketball, baseball, softball. The programming is across eight channels.

History
ESPN College Extra was announced by ESPN, Inc. on August 28, 2015, with launch date and its schedule. College Extra started broadcasting on September 5, 2015, at 12:30 p.m. with the Wofford vs. Clemson football game. At launch, the package was available on AT&T Uverse, Bright House Networks, Cox, DirecTV, select NCTC members, Time Warner Cable and Verizon FiOS.

Availability
ESPN College Extra is available with these cable and satellite providers:
 DirecTV (9/2015—
 Spectrum (9/2015—
 AT&T U-verse (9/2015—10/1/2016)
 Verizon FiOS (9/2015—5/31/2022
 PlayStation Vue (8/2018— 1/2020)
 Hulu (9/2018— present)

References

Out-of-market sports packages
Television channels and stations established in 2015
College basketball on television in the United States
College football on television